Evolution (2012)  is the fifth studio album by Greek thrash metal band Memorain. It was released on 7 August 2012 by Metal Maple Records.

Track listing
All music and lyrics composed by Ilias Papadakis, except where noted. Vocals Melodies on Rules Of Engagement by Tim "Ripper" Owens.

Personnel

Memorain
 Chris Valagao    – vocals
 Ilias Papadakis     – guitars  
 Gene Hoglan    – drums
 Steve DiGiorgio    – bass  
 Ralph Santolla     – guitars

Additional musicians
 Tim "Ripper" Owens – vocals on track 6
 David Ellefson – Bass on track 6,10
 Jeff Waters – main solo on track 10
 Laura Christine – main solo on track 8
 Christian Wentz – main solo on track 11
Marc Pattison – main solo on track 11
 Carlos Pérez – main solo on track 12

Production
Ilias Papadakis – producer 
Haris Zourelidis – mixing & mastering at Feedback Sound
Maria Sakantanis – illustrations, design
Thanos Doutsis – photography
Liza Hoglan – photography
Colin Davis – photography

References

2012 albums
Memorain albums